William A. Marovitz (born September 29, 1944) is an American lawyer and politician who was involved in real estate in Chicago and was married to Christie Hefner from 1995 to 2013.

Career
Marovitz is the son of Sydney Marovitz, the former longtime member of the Chicago Park District Board, and the nephew of the late federal judge Abraham Lincoln Marovitz, an attorney who served in the Illinois General Assembly for 19 years and started work as a real estate developer.

Business, political and civic career
Marovitz is a member of the Anti-Defamation League, the Weizmann Institute of Science, the Chicago Convention and Tourism Bureau, DePaul University, the Gene Siskel Film Center, and the Illinois Council Against Handgun Violence. He was president of the Marovitz Group. Marovitz was a Democratic state representative and state senator in Illinois and is a committeeman in the state Democratic Party's Central Committee. Marovitz served as a member of the Illinois Pollution Control Board from July 1, 2002, to November 30, 2003.

Marovitz was sued by the Securities Exchange Commission for allegedly using inside information to trade illegally in shares of Playboy. In 2011, he settled out of court for $168,352.

In In 2000, 2008, and 2016, Marovitz was a presidential elector from Illinois.

Election results
Marovitz won nine elections and was a member of the Illinois State Senate and the Illinois House of Representatives

Personal life
In 1995, Marovitz married Christie Hefner, who was CEO of Playboy Enterprises until January 2009. They had no children and split up in 2012.

References

External links 
  chicagobusiness.com

Living people
American real estate brokers
DePaul University people
Democratic Party members of the Illinois House of Representatives
Democratic Party Illinois state senators
2000 United States presidential electors
2008 United States presidential electors
Place of birth missing (living people)
Businesspeople from Illinois
1944 births
2016 United States presidential electors